The following is a list of all productions produced or released by Sony Pictures Animation, the animation division of Sony Pictures (part of Sony Entertainment), including animated and live-action feature films, shorts, television and internet series, and specials.

Feature films 
All films listed are produced by Columbia Pictures and distributed by Sony Pictures Releasing unless noted otherwise.

Released films

Upcoming films

In development

Related productions 
All films listed are distributed by Columbia Pictures unless noted otherwise.

Notes

Short films

Television series

Online series

Reception

Box office

Critical and public response

Accolades

Academy Awards

Golden Globe Awards

Annie Awards

Critics' Choice Movie Awards

Detroit Film Critics Society

St. Louis Gateway Film Critics Association Awards

Hollywood Critics Association

Hollywood Music in Media Awards

Houston Film Critics Society

People's Choice Awards

Kids' Choice Awards

Golden Raspberry Awards

Washington D.C. Area Film Critics Association

See also 

 List of Sony theatrical animated features
 List of unproduced Sony Pictures Animation projects

References 

Sony Pictures Animation
 
Lists of films by studio
American films by studio